Vahieroa may refer to:
Vahieroa (Tahitian mythology)
Vahieroa (Tuamotu mythology)